is a 2010 teen drama film directed by Hans Canosa and based on the 2007 young adult novel of the same name by Gabrielle Zevin. The film stars Japanese actress Maki Horikita, Japanese actors Kenichi Matsuyama and Yuya Tegoshi, and American actor Anton Yelchin.

Cast 

 Maki Horikita as Naomi Sukuse
 Yuya Tegoshi as Mirai Hasegawa
 Kenichi Matsuyama as Yuji Miwa
 Anton Yelchin as Ace Zuckerman
 Emma Roberts as Alice Leeds
 Misa Shimizu as Mrs. Hasegawa
 Atsuro Watabe as Goro Sukuse
 Kylee as Winnie
 Reira as Ace's new girlfriend
 Julia Sniegowski as Brianna
 Arthur Rempel as Robert Sutton
 Haruki Kimura as Bailey Plotkin
 Ai Ozaki as Yu Arisa
 Ian Moore as Mr. Weir
 Karen Kirishima as Risa Arisa
 Mirei Kiritani as Yumi
 Yukiko Hattori as Yuji's mother
 David Neale as Dr. Pillar
 Yui Ozaki as Eri Arisa
 Yoriko Kamimura as Ms. Ishibashi
 Michelle Take as Mrs. Tarkington

Production 

The film was announced in November 2008. The script was written by Gabrielle Zevin, the author of the novel the film was based on. When the film was announced, it was given the working title of Lost Memories. Filming began on 26 November 2008 and ended in early January 2009.

The film was originally planned to be shot and produced in the United States. However, the director decided that it would be better to make the film in Japan where the cultural aspects of the setting would enrich the story. The high school setting in the original story was changed to an international school for the film. This meant the film contained approximately a quarter of the English conversation as was in the original story.

Release 

The film opened in March 2010 on 247 screens in Japan. It was the 10th top earning film its opening weekend.

External links 

 

2010 films
2010s high school films
2010s teen drama films
American high school films
American teen drama films
Films about amnesia
Films based on American novels
Films based on young adult literature
Films shot in Los Angeles
Films shot in New York City
Films shot in San Francisco
Films shot in Tokyo
Japanese teen drama films
Japanese high school films
2010 drama films
2010s English-language films
2010s American films
2010s Japanese films